Laculataria is a genus of moths of the family Tortricidae.

Species
Laculataria asymmetra Razowski & Wojtusiak, 2006
Laculataria chlorochara Razowski & Wojtusiak, 2006
Laculataria chondrites Razowski & Wojtusiak, 2006
Laculataria nigroapicata Razowski & Wojtusiak, 2006
Laculataria splendida Razowski & Wojtusiak, 2009

See also
List of Tortricidae genera

References

External links
tortricidae.com

Eucosmini
Tortricidae genera
Taxa named by Józef Razowski